{{DISPLAYTITLE:C25H22O10}}
The molecular formula C25H22O10 may refer to:

 Silibinin, major active constituent of silymarin
 Umbilicaric acid, an organic polyphenolic carboxylic acid

Molecular formulas